The 2012–13 season was Dynamo's 22nd Ukrainian Premier League season, and their third season under manager Yuri Semin. Yuri Semin was sacked 24 September 2012 after losing by Dynamo to principal rivals FC Shakhtar Donetsk in the Ukrainian Cup. On 25 September 2012, Oleh Blokhin was appointed new manager. During the season, Dynamo Kyiv competed in the Ukrainian Premier League, Ukrainian Cup and in the UEFA Champions League.

Current squad
Squad is given according to the club's official website.

Out on loan

Managerial changes

Competitions

Ukrainian Premier League

League table

Results summary

Results by round

Matches

Ukrainian Cup

UEFA Champions League

Third qualifying round

Play-off round

Group stage

UEFA Europa League

Knockout phase

Round of 32

Squad statistics

Goalscorers

Appearances and goals

|-
|colspan="14"|Players who appeared for Dynamo who left the club during the season:

|}

Disciplinary record

References

External links
Official website

Dynamo Kyiv
FC Dynamo Kyiv seasons
Dynamo Kyiv
Dynamo Kyiv